Smirnovo is a rural locality (a selo) in Novokopylovsky Selsoviet, Zarinsky District, Altai Krai, Russia. The population was 263 as of 2013. There are 4 streets.

Geography 
Smirnovo is located 25 km west of Zarinsk (the district's administrative centre) by road. Novokopylovo is the nearest rural locality.

References 

Rural localities in Zarinsky District